Azerbaijan competed in the Winter Olympic Games for the first time at the 1998 Winter Olympics in Nagano, Japan.

Figure skating

Men

Women

Pairs

Key: FS = Free Skate, SP = Short Program, TFP = Total Factored Placement

References
Official Olympic Reports
 Olympic Winter Games 1998, full results by sports-reference.com

Nations at the 1998 Winter Olympics
1998
1998 in Azerbaijani sport